is a former Japanese football player.

Playing career
Inoue was born in Kanagawa Prefecture on October 31, 1977. He joined his local club, the Yokohama Flügels, as part of the youth team in 1996. Although he debuted in 1998, the club was disbanded at the end of the 1998 season due to financial strain. In 1999, he moved to JEF United Ichihara. Although he played for three seasons, he did not play in many matches. In August 2001, he moved to the Japan Football League (JFL) club Sagawa Express Tokyo. He was a regular player, playing as a defensive midfielder in 2002 and left side back in 2003. However he did not play any games in 2004. In 2005, he moved to the Ventforet Kofu. He played often as left side back. In 2009, he moved to the newly promoted J2 League club, Tochigi SC. Although he played as a regular player through June, he did not play as much after that. In September 2009, he moved to the JFL club TDK (later Blaublitz Akita). He played as a regular player until 2010. In 2011, he moved to the Regional Leagues club Tonan Maebashi. He retired at the end of the 2011 season.

Club statistics

References

External links

1977 births
Living people
Association football people from Kanagawa Prefecture
Japanese footballers
J1 League players
J2 League players
Japan Football League players
Yokohama Flügels players
JEF United Chiba players
Sagawa Shiga FC players
Montedio Yamagata players
Ventforet Kofu players
Tochigi SC players
Blaublitz Akita players
Association football defenders